Ada Isensee (born 12 May 1944) is a German stained glass artist.

Life

Isensee was born in Potsdam in 1944. In 1964 she began studying psychology at the Ludwig Maximilian University of Munich completing her qualification in Tübingen. She was complete in 1967 and went to study at the École nationale supérieure des Beaux-Arts in Paris.

Isensee has work in collections including the Corning Museum of Glass and she has led several exhibitions.

She was married to  who was another glass artist. They had moved in the 1970s to live and work in Buoch where they raised two sons. He died in 2000. In 2015 she was asked to create a retrospective exhibition in Remshalden.

References

1944 births
Living people
People from Potsdam
20th-century German painters
German women painters
21st-century German painters
Stained glass artists and manufacturers